Loup (French for wolf) may refer to:

Places
The Loup, a village in Northern Ireland
Loup Canal, a canal in Nebraska
Loup County, Nebraska
Loup River, a tributary of the Platte River in Nebraska, USA
Loup (river), a coastal river in southeastern France
Loup Township (disambiguation), multiple locations

Other
, a 2009 film by Nicolas Vanier
Loup (card game), an historic card game variant of Tippen
Loup (name), French given name and surname
"Loup (1st Indian on the Moon)", a song by Paul McCartney and Wings from the 1973 album Red Rose Speedway
Saint Lupus (disambiguation) (Saint Loup), the name of some early French bishops
Loup language, an extinct Algonquian language
Archaic blazon for wolf (heraldry)
Loup, a character in the webcomic Gunnerkrigg Court

See also
Loup Loup (disambiguation)
Loop (disambiguation)
Loupe, a magnification device
Wolf (disambiguation)